Champerico is a town and municipality in the Retalhuleu department in southwestern Guatemala. It is a popular vacation spot for Guatemalans in the region.  The picturesque beach town was founded on the Pacific Ocean in 1872, and the paved road to Retalhuleu makes Champerico one of the most important ports on the Pacific.  The port handles mostly coffee, timber and sugar.

References

External links
View of Champerico at Wikimapia

Municipalities of the Retalhuleu Department
Ports and harbours of Guatemala